Jean Castex (born 25 June 1965) is a French politician who was the country's Prime Minister from 3 July 2020 to 16 May 2022. He was a member of The Republicans (LR) until 2020, when he joined La République En Marche! (LREM). Castex served for twelve years as mayor of the small town of Prades prior to his appointment as Prime Minister by President Emmanuel Macron. He resigned his post in May 2022.

Political career
Elected in 2008 as the mayor of Prades, Pyrénées-Orientales,  Castex served under Health Minister Xavier Bertrand as Chief of Staff in François Fillon's ministry from 2010 until 2011. He succeeded Raymond Soubie as Secretary-General of the Élysée under President Nicolas Sarkozy between 2011 and 2012. In the UMP 2012 leadership primaries, he endorsed Fillon.

On the local level, Castex was a regional councillor of Languedoc-Roussillon from 2010 to 2015, and has served as department councillor of Pyrénées-Orientales since 2015.  In September 2017, Castex was appointed interdepartmental delegate to the 2024  Olympics and Paralympics; he was also appointed as President of the National Sports Agency. On 2 April 2020, he was appointed coordinator of the phasing out of the lockdown implemented during the COVID-19 pandemic in France. 

Castex was a member of The Republicans until early 2020, where he was regarded as being socially conservative. Following Édouard Philippe's resignation on 3 July 2020, Castex was appointed Prime Minister by President Emmanuel Macron. His appointment was described as a "doubling down on a course that is widely seen as centre-right in economic terms". Castex subsequently named his government on 6 July.

On 25 April 2022, following Macron's re-election as President, Castex agreed to resign as Prime Minister. Castex had previously pledged to do so if Macron was re-elected. Upon his resignation, Castex's government resigned as well, effective on 16 May.

Life after politics
After leaving office, Castex was nominated by his successor Élisabeth Borne as chairman of the board of directors of the Agence de financement des infrastructures de transport de France (AFITF).

Personal life
Castex, whose name means 'castle' in Gascon, hails from the Gers. He is married to Sandra Ribelaygue; they have four daughters. 

A fluent Catalan speaker, Castex is regarded a defender of the Catalan identity in Southern France and other regional sensibilities. He is also friends with the ex-trades union leader Jean-Claude Mailly and the physician Patrick Pelloux, a former columnist at Charlie Hebdo.

Castex tested positive for COVID-19 on 23 November 2021.

Honours

See also
 Castex government

References

External links

Curriculum vitae 

1965 births
Living people
University of Toulouse alumni
Sciences Po alumni
École nationale d'administration alumni
Judges of the Court of Audit (France)
French chief executives
Mayors of places in Occitania (administrative region)
Union for a Popular Movement politicians
The Republicans (France) politicians
La République En Marche! politicians
Chevaliers of the Légion d'honneur
Grand Cross of the Ordre national du Mérite
Prime Ministers of France
French people of Catalan descent
People from Gers
Departmental councillors (France)
Regional councillors of France